Maqdis Shalim Alfarizi (born April 8, 1989 in Cirebon) is an Indonesian footballer who currently plays for Pelita Jaya FC in the Indonesia Super League.

Club statistics

Hounors

Clubs
Pelita Jaya U-21 :
Indonesia Super League U-21 champions : 1 (2008-09)
Indonesia Super League U-21 runner-up : 1 (2009-10)

References

External links

1989 births
Association football midfielders
Living people
Indonesian footballers
Liga 1 (Indonesia) players
Pelita Jaya FC players
People from Cirebon
Sportspeople from West Java